Mangwana is a surname. Notable people with the surname include:

Paul Mangwana (born 1961), Zimbabwean politician
Sam Mangwana (born 1945), Congolese musician

Bantu-language surnames